A wet sub is a type of underwater vehicle, either a submarine or a submersible, that does not provide a dry environment for its occupants. It is also described as an underwater vehicle where occupants are exposed to ambient environment during operations. The watercraft is classified as medium-sized or small vessel. This type of submarine differs from other underwater personal transport devices by the fact that it has a hull around it and it is not a "bare bones" design.

Usually, scuba divers ride outside the device as one would ride a motorcycle or in a semi-enclosed opening like a kayak or bobsled, although it can be designed to fully enclose its occupant(s) to reduce drag. An enclosed vehicle may also provide a dry viewing chamber for the occupant(s). The sub is generally propelled by an electric motor and is battery powered. The depth and endurance is typically limited by the requirements of the divers, particularly water temperature and breathable air.

Military use

Wet subs have been used to transport and deploy special operations forces in waters too shallow for an ordinary submarine, lay mines (particularly for attaching limpet mines directly to a ship), firing torpedoes, or gathering intelligence in harbors. They have also been used to plant listening and recording devices on undersea cables in Operation Ivy Bells.  For military use, the operator will sometimes use a rebreather device so as not to leave a trail of bubbles. Military wet subs are deployed from a larger submarine or from a surface ship. The SEAL Delivery Vehicle (SDV) used by the United States Navy SEALs and British Special Boat Service is an example that is in use today. The SDV is used to insert Navy SEALs in shallow coastal waters or attack surface ships 

The Motorised Submersible Canoe, developed by the British Special Operations Executive during World War II, is another example.

Hobbyists

A wet sub is attractive to the amateur or small commercial builder since many of the problems associated with a dry sub are avoided as only the propulsion and power systems need to be waterproof and life support is much less of an issue than it is with a sealed occupant chamber. Complete submarines of this type are also available commercially.

Wet sub designs are often used for human-powered submarines because they are smaller and lighter than dry submarines. An example is the pedal-operated wet-sub called "the Scubster", which is powered by a twin propeller connected to the pedal belt.

Research 

Every two years, a human-powered submarine race takes place at the Naval Warfare Surface Center in Bethesda, Maryland.

See also

Military wetsubs
 SEAL Delivery Vehicle
 Human torpedo
Commercial wetsubs
 Necker Nymph
 Diver propulsion vehicle
Scubster

Custom wetsubs
 Wet Nellie

References